The Vorontsov Lighthouse is a red-and-white, 27.2 metre tall lighthouse in the Black Sea port of Odesa, Ukraine. It is named after Prince Mikhail Semyonovich Vorontsov, one of the governors-general of the Odessa region.

Construction
 
The lighthouse was built with iron tubing and lead gaskets. It has a one-million-watt signal light that can be seen up to twelve nautical miles (22 km) away. It transmits the Morse Code signal of three dashes, the letter O, for Odesa.  It also sounds a foghorn during severe storms or fog.

The lighthouse is connected with the port's shoreline by a long stone causeway and jetty, which protect the port from the southern high seas. The port is protected on the east by huge concrete breakwaters built on rocks, that rise above the water.

History
The current lighthouse is the third to stand on the same spot. The first was built in 1862 and was made of wood.

See also

 List of lighthouses in Ukraine

References

External links

 

Buildings and structures in Odesa
Lighthouses in Ukraine
Tourist attractions in Odesa
Lighthouses completed in 1862
1860s establishments in Ukraine
1862 establishments in the Russian Empire